Deanna Doughty (born 7 December 1993) is a New Zealand cricketer who bowls leg spin. In February 2019, Doughty took a five-wicket haul for the Wellington Blaze in the Hallyburton Johnstone Shield tournament. In November 2019, she was named as the captain of the team.

In August 2020, she was named in New Zealand's squad for their series against Australia, earning her maiden call-up to the national team. Doughty has been part of the national setup since 2012, playing for the New Zealand Emerging Players team in their home series against England.

References

1993 births
Living people
New Zealand women cricketers
Cricketers from Porirua